{{DISPLAYTITLE:C30H46O3}}
The molecular formula C30H46O3 (molar mass: 454.68 g/mol, exact mass: 454.3447 u) may refer to:

 Moronic acid
 Testosterone buciclate
 Testosterone undecylenate (TUe)

Molecular formulas